Beta-L-rhamnosidase is an enzyme with systematic name beta-L-rhamnoside rhamnohydrolase. This enzyme catalyses the following chemical reaction

 Hydrolysis of terminal, non-reducing beta-L-rhamnose residues in beta-L-rhamnosides

References

External links 
 

EC 3.2.1